The Embassy of the Federal Democratic Republic of Ethiopia in London is the diplomatic mission of Ethiopia in the United Kingdom. It is located in a terrace overlooking Hyde Park in Kensington Road, South Kensington, next to the Embassy of Iran. The building forms one of a group of Grade II listed stucco buildings, along with the Iranian Embassy and the Polish Institute and Sikorski Museum.

Gallery

References

External links
Official site

Diplomatic missions in London
Diplomatic missions of Ethiopia
Ethiopia–United Kingdom relations
Grade II listed buildings in the City of Westminster
South Kensington